Stadiumi Skënderbeu is a multi-purpose stadium in Korçë, Albania. The ground is currently the home of Skënderbeu. It has a seating capacity of 12,343 people all seater.

History  
The stadium is the current grounds for Skënderbeu as well as other municipal and national athletic events. It was first opened in 1957, and then later fully renovated in 2010, thanks to major contributions by various corporate donors. The stadium was approved by UEFA, to hold preliminary rounds of Champions League matches in 2011.

References

External links
 Stadium pictures

KF Skënderbeu Korçë
Buildings and structures in Korçë
Skenderbeu
Sports venues completed in 1957
1957 establishments in Albania